Krasnoyarka (Kızıl-Ĵar) is a rural locality (a settlement) in Ust-Koksinsky District, the Altai Republic, Russia. The population was 61 as of 2016. There are 3 streets.

References 

Rural localities in Ust-Koksinsky District